Dry Creek Café & Boat Dock was a dive bar and boat dock located on Mount Bonnell Road in Austin, Texas. After 68 years in operation, the establishment closed down on October 31, 2021.

See also
 List of dive bars

References

Defunct dive bars
Dive bars in the United States
Companies based in Austin, Texas
Drinking establishments in Texas
Restaurants established in 1953
1953 establishments in Texas
2021 disestablishments in Texas